Sunday Uti (born 23 October 1962) is a former Nigerian sprinter who won an Olympic bronze medal in 4 x 400 metres relay in Los Angeles 1984. He finished sixth in the final of the individual 400 metres contest.

In addition he won the gold medal at the 1983 Summer Universiade, and a bronze medal in 1985. He also took the silver medal at the 1984 African Championships.

Achievements

External links

1962 births
Living people
Nigerian male sprinters
Athletes (track and field) at the 1980 Summer Olympics
Athletes (track and field) at the 1984 Summer Olympics
Athletes (track and field) at the 1988 Summer Olympics
Olympic athletes of Nigeria
Olympic bronze medalists for Nigeria
Olympic bronze medalists in athletics (track and field)
Universiade medalists in athletics (track and field)
Universiade gold medalists for Nigeria
Universiade bronze medalists for Nigeria
Medalists at the 1984 Summer Olympics
Medalists at the 1983 Summer Universiade
20th-century Nigerian people